For the 1991 Rugby World Cup, 16 nations participated in the finals tournament, half of which came through qualifying matches, and the other were granted automatic entry as they were quarter-finalists at the 1987 Rugby World Cup. The 25 teams taking part in regional qualifiers together with the 8 teams which qualified automatically brings to 33 the total number of teams participating in the 1991 Rugby World Cup.

Qualified teams

Automatic qualifiers
The five tournament hosts, as well as all quarter-finalists from the previous (1987) Rugby World Cup, automatically qualified for the final tournament.
 (quarter-finalist and host) 
 (quarter-finalist) 
 (quarter-finalist and host)
 (quarter-finalist and host) 
 (semi-finalist) 
 (semi-finalist and host) 
 (finalist and host) 
 (champions)

Regional qualifiers

Africa 
  (Africa 1)

Europe 
  (Europe 1)
  (Europe 2)

Asia and Oceania
In qualification for the 1991 Rugby World Cup, Asia and Oceania were combined. The qualifying round-robin tournament was played in Japan in April 1990. The top two teams (Western Samoa and Japan) qualified for the finals and were allocated to Pool 3 and Pool 2, respectively.

  (Asia 1)
  (Asia 2)

Standings

Results

Americas
Three nations from the Americas competed in qualifying matches for the 1991 Rugby World Cup. Because the Americas region had three places at the 1991 Rugby World Cup, all three participating countries from the Americas—Argentina, Canada and the United States—qualified for the finals tournament, with the qualifying tournament deciding to which pool each team would be allocated at the finals.

  (Americas 1)
  (Americas 2)
  (Americas 3)

Standings

Results 

Canada, Argentina and the United States qualified for the 1991 Rugby World Cup, with Canada allocated to Pool 4, Argentina to Pool 3 and the United States to Pool 2.

See also 
 Africa qualification
 European qualification
 Americas qualification
 Asia and Oceania qualification

External links
Rugbyworldcup.com